Cholo is a loosely defined Spanish term that has had various meanings. Its origin is a somewhat derogatory term for people of mixed-blood heritage in the Spanish Empire in Latin America and its successor states as part of castas, the informal ranking of society by heritage. Cholo no longer necessarily refers only to ethnic heritage, and is not always meant negatively. Cholo can signify anything from its original sense as a person with one Amerindian parent and one Mestizo parent, "gangster" in Mexico, an insult in some South American countries (similar to chulo in Spain), or a "person who dresses in the manner of a certain subculture" in the United States as part of the cholo subculture.

Historical usage

In his work Vocabulario en Lengua Castellana y Mexicana (1571), Fray Alonso de Molina reports that the word "cholo" or "xolo" derives from Nahuatl and means "paje, moço, criado o esclavo" ("page, waiter, servant or slave").

The term's use to describe a caste is first recorded in a Peruvian book published in 1609 and 1616, the Comentarios Reales de los Incas by Inca Garcilaso de la Vega. He writes (in Spanish) "The child of a Black male and an Indian female, or of an Indian male and Black female, they call mulato and mulata. The children of these they call cholos. Cholo is a word from the Windward Islands; it means dog, not of the purebred variety, but of very disreputable origin; and the Spaniards use it for insult and vituperation". Interestingly, the Mexican hairless dog is known as "xoloitzcuintli" or "xolo" in Nahuatl.

In Ecuador, mestizas wearing indigenous attire in Ecuador were termed cholas. "Chola appears to have been a designation largely reserved for women and which, according to Jacques Poloni-Simard, was used to indicate mestiza women who had achieved an incipient degree of hispanization that was beyond the grasp of men, who were more firmly bound to their native communities by tribute obligations."

In Imperial Mexico, the terms cholo and coyote co-existed, indicating mixed Mestizo and Amerindian ancestry. Under the casta designations of colonial Mexico, the term rarely appears; however, an eighteenth-century casta painting by Ignacio María Barreda shows the grouping Español, India, with their offspring a Mestizo or Cholo

Cholo as an English-language term dates at least to 1851 when it was used by Herman Melville in his novel Moby-Dick, referring to a Spanish speaking sailor, possibly derived from the Windward Islands reference mentioned above. Isela Alexsandra Garcia of the University of California at Berkeley writes that the term can be traced to Mexico, where in the early part of the last century it referred to "culturally marginal" mestizos and Native American origin.

During the War of the Pacific (1879–1883) Peruvians were contemptuously referred to as "cholos" by Chilean officers.

An article in the Los Angeles Express of April 2, 1907, headlined "Cleaning Up the Filthy Cholo Courts Has Begun in Earnest", uses the terms cholos and Mexicans interchangeably. The term cholo courts was defined in The Journal of San Diego History as "sometimes little more than instant slums as shanties were strewn almost randomly around city lots in order to create cheap horizontal tenements."

Modern usage

United States

Cholos, cholas and cholitas are used as informal slang terms in parts of the US, to refer to people of Peruvian, Bolivian, Mexican, and many others of descent, who usually are low-income and "tough", and may wear stereotypical clothes. This is usually used to refer to people who are born in different places.

Bolivia

In Bolivia, "cholo" refers to people with various degrees of Amerindian racial ancestry. In Bolivia, the term "cholita" has overcome former prejudice and discrimination, and cholitas are now seen as fashion icons.  A "cholo" in Bolivia is a campesino who moved to the city, and though the term was originally derogatory, has become more of a symbol of indigenous power.  The word "cholo/a" is considered a common and/or official enough term in Bolivia such that "cholo" has been included as its own ethnic group option in demographic surveys conducted in the country. In these same surveys, the term had on occasion been used interchangeably with the term "mestizo." Nevertheless, some locals still use cholo as a derogatory term.

Ecuador
Cholos pescadores are a group of traditional fishermen along the coasts of Ecuador.

Peru
In Peru, Mestizos with greater Amerindian contributions (Indo-mestizo), are 27.7%: Those that would be in the range of 75% to 60% of Amerindian contributions, characterized by presenting a tonality of tan, brown, and brunette skin with major features of Amerindian ethnic groups. They are mostly descendants of Quechua peoples at around 23.7%; of other ethnic groups originating from the coast in 2%; of the Aymaras by 1.5%; of native ethnic groups of the jungle at 0.5%. Of the total of this sub-group around half are in the mountains, an important part of this segment due to migration are on the coast, preferably in Lima, major urban centers and finally around a quarter (1/4 ) in the jungle, they could also be called Indo-mestizos or the so-called "Peruvian cholo".

Mexico
The cholo gangs started from the U.S. in the mid to late 1920s.  Cholo groups in Mexico were well established at least by the mid-1970s along the US-Mexico border, and in Central Mexico. These were called by various names, such as "barrios", "clickas" and "gangas". They were typically seen as American Hispanics and not as Mexicans because of their dress and appearance, which was not traditionally worn Mexico.  Many of these groups were formed by youths who had spent time in the United States and who returned with a different identity picked up in U.S. street life. These groups mimic the organization of gangs in the United States, especially California, Texas and Chicago. Cholos have their own style of dress and speech. They are known for hand signals, tattoos and graffiti. Groups of cholos control various territories in the city. Most of the violence among these groups is over territory. Well established Latino gangs from the United States (such as Norteños, Sureños, Latin Kings, 18th Street Gang and MS-13) have made a strong presence in Mexico through making alliances with local drug cartels based on particular regions or cities.

See also

 Aymara ethnic group
 Caboclo
 Chicano
 Chulo (disambiguation)
 Coyote (racial category)
 Mixed Race Day
 Naco (slang)
 Pachuco
 Zambo

References

External links 
The Folk Feminist Struggle Behind the Chola Fashion Trend an article describing Chola history from Vice Magazine

Ethnic and religious slurs
Mexican slang
Spanish words and phrases
Latin American caste system
Multiracial affairs in the Americas
Social class subcultures
Hispanic and Latino American culture
Hispanic and Latino American portrayals in media
Anti-indigenous racism in the Americas
Motorcycling subculture in the United States
Mestizo